Lieutenant-General Sir James Campbell, KB ( – May 11, 1745) was a Scottish professional soldier, Member of Parliament for Ayrshire from 1727 to 1741, and Governor of Edinburgh Castle from 1738 to 1745.

A distinguished cavalry officer, Campbell served in the War of the Spanish Succession and supported George I of Great Britain in 1714, which allowed him to pursue a career as a Whig. Promoted Lieutenant-General in 1740, during the War of the Austrian Succession he was knighted for his service at Dettingen in 1743. He commanded the British cavalry at Fontenoy in May 1745, where he lost a leg to a French cannonball and later died of his wounds.

Personal details

James Campbell was born  in Lawers, Perthshire. His father, James Campbell, 2nd Earl of Loudoun, was an aristocrat and son of noted Covenanter John Campbell. Campbell's mother was Lady Margaret Montgomerie, the daughter of landowner Hugh Montgomerie, 7th Earl of Eglinton. His brother, Hugh Campbell, would go on to serve as the last Secretary of State of the Kingdom of Scotland prior to the Acts of Union.

On 29 March 1720, Campbell married Lady Jean Boyle Mure (1698–1729), eldest daughter of David Boyle, 1st Earl of Glasgow and his second wife, Lady Jean Mure. They had at least two children, James (1726–1786) and Margaret (some accounts refer to her as Elizabeth), who was born on 17 May 1727. Mure died on 19 December 1729 and her body interred in the town of Kilmarnock, Ayrshire on 26 December; Campbell never remarried after her death.

Campbell changed his son's surname to Mure-Campbell in 1729 so he could inherit Rowallan Castle near Kilmaurs, Ayrshire, an old family possession. James inherited the estate at Lawers, and became the fifth Earl of Loudoun when the fourth earl died in 1782.

Career: pre-1713

In September 1693, when he was approximately thirteen years old, Campbell was commissioned into the Scots Guards as a lieutenant, then promoted captain on July 1699. In 1701, the War of the Spanish Succession broke out; the next year, Campbell was transferred to the Earl of Mar's Regiment of Foot, renewing his own officer's commission in the process.

Campbell was then sent along with the rest of his regiment to Europe, where they fought in the Battle of Blenheim on 13 August 1704, a decisive victory for the Grand Alliance. In August 1706, Campbell purchased a commission as lieutenant colonel in the Royal North British Dragoons, with whom he fought at the battles of Oudenarde and Malplaquet, both major Allied victories.

Career; post 1713
In 1713, the Treaty of Utrecht was signed between the Grand Alliance and the Kingdom of France, bringing British involvement in the conflict to an end (the kingdoms of Scotland and England having been united into the Kingdom of Great Britain in 1707). After the treaty was signed, Campbell started becoming involved in British political affairs, joining forces with his brother Hugh in supporting the Hanoverian Succession to Britain's Queen Anne.

In 1715, Campbell was transferred to Henry Cornewall's Regiment of Foot at the rank of colonel; two years later, he was transferred back to the Royal North British Dragoons at the same rank. When George II of Great Britain succeeded his father to the throne of Great Britain in 1727, he appointed Campbell to the position of Groom of the Chamber, a high-ranking position in Britain's royal household, in recognition of his "military gallantry".

In the same year, Campbell became a Member of Parliament, running unopposed for the parliamentary constituency of Ayrshire at the 1727 British general election "through the influence of his brother." Campbell continued to sit in the House of Commons of Great Britain until the 1741 British general election, when he was defeated by Patrick Craufurd, an anti-Walpole politician supported by John Campbell, 2nd Duke of Argyll.

During his time in Parliament, Campbell consistently supported the Whigs, which dominated the British political scene during the Georgian era. In his political career, Campbell was held in high regard, even by his opponents. Due to Campbell's reputation, Craufurd's supporters in the 1741 general election spread propaganda that he was unwilling to stand for election in the first place, but had been pushed to become involved by outside parties; those alleged to be involved included his brother, Archibald and elements in the British royal court.

Campbell continued to serve in the British Army during this period, though as historian Henry Morse Stephens noted, the tenure of Walpole as British Prime Minister "prevented Campbell from seeing service for twenty-eight years" as Walpole was committed to a policy of non-interventionism. In 1735, Campbell was promoted to the rank of brigadier-general, and four years later, in 1739, he was promoted again to the rank of major-general.

In 1738, Campbell was appointed to the position of Edinburgh Castle governor, succeeding Lord Ross. His duties included supervising the castle's large garrison. Campbell continued to hold this position until his death, when he was succeeded by Lord Mark Kerr. During his tenure, a crow-stepped and classical residence for the governor, known as the Governor's House, was constructed inside the castle by army engineer Dugal Campbell in 1742.

Later life and death

The War of the Austrian Succession broke out in 1740, and as a member of the Pragmatic Alliance, in 1742 a British expeditionary force was despatched to Germany, nominally commanded by George II. Campbell was promoted lieutenant-general, in charge of the British cavalry. On 27 June 1743, the Allies narrowly defeated the French at Dettingen. Campbell's cavalry charge against the elite Maison Militaire du Roi de France, played a major role in securing victory and in recognition of his performance George II personally appointed him a Knight of the Order of the Bath.

However, the Pragmatic commanders could not agree on how best to exploit their victory, and ended up retiring to winter quarters in the Dutch Republic. While George II soon returned to England, Campbell remained as commander of the British and Hanoverian cavalry. During the 1745 campaign in Flanders, he accompanied an Allied force led by George's son the Duke of Cumberland sought to relieve Tournai, which was being besieged by the French under Maurice de Saxe. On 9 May, the Allies found Saxe entrenched in strong positions near the village of Antoing and Campbell's cavalry successfully pushed French troops out of two hamlets. His deputy, the Earl of Crawford, then recommended that infantry be used to clear a nearby forest, though the plan was abandoned when Dutch hussars were driven off by hidden French troops.

At the ensuing Battle of Fontenoy on 11 May, Cumberland ordered an infantry assault the French positions, supported by cavalry charges led by Campbell. As the Allied troops began to retreat from the battlefield towards the end of the day, Campbell was hit in the leg by a French cannonball, which tore it off. He died of his wounds as he was being put into a litter and his corpse was transported to Brussels, where it was buried.

Footnotes

References

Bibliography

 
 
 
 
 
 
 
 
 
 
 
 
 
 
 
 
 
 
 

1680s births
1745 deaths
Younger sons of earls
British Army lieutenant generals
British Army personnel of the War of the Spanish Succession
British Army personnel of the War of the Austrian Succession
British military personnel killed in the War of the Austrian Succession
British MPs 1727–1734
British MPs 1734–1741
Royal Norfolk Regiment officers
Royal Scots Fusiliers officers
Royal Scots Greys officers
Members of the Parliament of Great Britain for Scottish constituencies
People from Perthshire
Whig (British political party) MPs for Scottish constituencies
Knights Companion of the Order of the Bath